Sheykhlan (also Romanized as Sheykhlān) is a village in Fazl Rural District, in the Central District of Nishapur County, Razavi Khorasan Province, Iran. At the 2006 census, its population was 60, in 20 families.

References 

Populated places in Nishapur County